Antihaitianismo, also called anti-Haitianism in some English sources, is prejudice or social discrimination against Haitians in the Dominican Republic.

Antihaitianismo includes prejudice against, hatred of, or discrimination against Haitians due to their physical appearance, culture, lifestyle, and language.

Antihaitianismo in the Dominican Republic

Origins: 16th century through 19th century

Human Rights Watch has stated in their reports that the differences between Haitians and Dominicans can be based on colonial times from linguistic, cultural, and racial differences. For instance, the Dominican Republic was governed by the Spanish, and thus acquired part of their culture from the Spanish, mixed with Africans and Native Americans. Haiti, on the other hand, was governed by the French, and its culture is a mixture of French, African and Native American. The majority of Haiti's population is descended almost entirely from African slaves, while Dominicans possess a multiracial mix of Spanish, African and Indigenous ancestry. It is evident that historical background is related between the two countries, however, there are major cultural divisions.
 
Antihaitianismo can be traced back to a  policy of racial segregation instituted by the Spaniards in the Captaincy General of Santo Domingo (present-day Dominican Republic).  Prior to the arrival of Europeans, the island was split into absolutist chiefdoms, three where modern-day Santo Domingo now exists, and two where modern-day Haiti now exists (albeit also including some territory which is currently part of Santo Domingo).  Carib people from islands further south were often at war with the Taíno people. Columbus reached the island in 1492 (slaves imported from Africa arrived from 1503 onwards—many natives were also soon enslaved), and within a few decades the Spanish controlled most of the island. During the 17th century, however, the French also began maneuvering for control, and in 1697 acquired the western portion (now part of Haiti—whereas the Spanish portion encompassed the modern Dominican Republic). During the 1790s and early 19th century, the French and Spanish battled back and forth across the island; by 1809 the Haitian Revolution had resulted in the overthrow of both French and Spanish control.  The Spanish briefly retook the eastern portion that same year, but in 1821 lost control again in another rebellion. Shortly afterwards, Haitian forces again briefly controlled the entire island, from 1822 to 1844. In 1844 the secret revolutionary movement called "La Trinitaria" took place and the Dominican Republic declared its independence defeating the Haitian forces. After several tumultuous decades, the Spanish briefly acquired nominal control of the Dominican Republic in the 1860s, setting off another war. By the late 19th century, over three hundred years of European control was ended; the modern history of west Hispaniola (Haiti) and east Hispaniola (Dominican Republic) had begun.

Under Trujillo: 1930s and 1940s
Antihaitianismo was strongly institutionalized during the regime of Rafael Leónidas Trujillo. Border disputes under Trujillo culminated in the order of a military intervention and to massacre Haitians accused of practicing vodou or witchery, practices that were against the popular Roman Catholic beliefs in the Dominican Republic at the time. Claims range "from several hundred to 26,000" or even "recorded as having a death toll reaching 30,000" in October 1937, an event subsequently named the Parsley Massacre.  During later diplomacy, Trujillo agreed to pay hundreds of thousands in reparations, but somewhat less was actually delivered.  Due to corrupt Haitian bureaucrats, exceedingly little reached the families. Dominican intellectuals Manuel Arturo Peña Batlle, Joaquín Balaguer, Manuel de Jesús Troncoso de la Concha, among others, led the campaign.

The 1937 massacre legitimized subsequent state acts of violence against the Haitian-origin population in the Dominican Republic. Each successive government since has forcibly removed thousands of Haitians and Haitian-Dominicans in routine round-ups and expulsions by the military.

Present day: 1990s
Trujillo's policies served to perpetuate antihaitianismo within the Dominican Republic.  In the 1996 Dominican presidential election, Joaquín Balaguer (historical leader of the populist right and former right-hand of dictator Trujillo) united in a "National Patriotic Front" with PLD candidate Leonel Fernández in order to prevent José Francisco Peña Gómez, who was adopted as an infant by a Dominican family but born to Haitian parents, from becoming President.

See also
Racial segregation
Sonia Pierre
Virgins of Galindo
Haitian Revolution
Dominican Independence
Code Noir
Unification of Hispaniola
Dominican Restoration War

References

External links
Sonia Pierre's struggle for justice – article in The Socialist Worker
 The Double-Edged Sword of Racism and Sexism – article about Afro-Dominican women in the Dominican Republic
Ruling of the Inter-American Court of Human Rights in the case of Yean and Bosico v. Dominican Republic

Anti-black racism in North America
Haitian
Discrimination in the Dominican Republic
Dominican Republic–Haiti relations
Rafael Trujillo
 
Francophobia
Society of the Dominican Republic